Mimi Gianopulos is an American actress. She is best known for her supporting role as Molly in the 2012 film What to Expect When You're Expecting.

Career
Gianopulos' first screen acting role was in the 2007 film Moondance Alexander, starring Kay Panabaker and Don Johnson. In 2013, she starred in the titular role in the unsold ABC Family sitcom pilot Continuing Fred. Also in 2013, she was cast in the film Get a Job, also starring Anna Kendrick and Miles Teller. Gianopulos also had a recurring role as Angela on the ABC Family sitcom Baby Daddy.

Personal life
Gianopulos is of Greek descent. She is the daughter of film executive Jim Gianopulos, and has two younger sisters.

Filmography

References

External links

21st-century American actresses
American film actresses
American people of Greek descent
American television actresses
Living people
Place of birth missing (living people)
Year of birth missing (living people)
Carnegie Mellon University alumni